Peter Chin Fah Kui (born 31 August 1945) is a former Malaysian politician. He was the Member of Parliament for Miri from 1985 to 2013 and served from 2004 to 2013 as a minister in the federal cabinet. From 2011 to 2014 he was the president of the Sarawak United Peoples' Party (SUPP). He is a Malaysian Chinese and of Hakka descent.

Early life
Chin was born in Kuching, Sarawak. He is married to Puan Sri Ruby Wee Hui Kiang, with whom he has two daughters and one son. He was educated as a barrister-at-law at Gray's Inn, London in 1971.

Chin returned to Sarawak and joined the law firm, M/s Wan Ullok, Jugah & Chin and started his law practice in Miri, Sarawak, in 1972. Tan Sri Peter Chin was the chairman for Miri Municipal Council in 1984. He retired as a partner of the law firm upon his appointment as the parliamentary secretary to the Federal Ministry of Welfare in 1986.

Political career
He has been the Member of Parliament of Miri in Malaysia since 1985 and he was the party organising secretary of the Sarawak United People's Party (SUPP).

In 2004, he was appointed to the Cabinet of Malaysia as the minister of plantation industries and commodities. Prior to his full ministerial appointment, his previous posts were deputy minister of housing and local government and deputy minister of science, technology and environment.

On 10 April 2009, Chin was appointed as the minister of energy, green technology and water.

In 2011 he became the president of SUPP. He retired from Parliament in 2013, and stood down as SUPP's president in 2014.

Election results

Honours

Honours of Malaysia
  :
  Commander of the Order of Loyalty to the Crown of Malaysia (PSM) – Tan Sri (2013)
  :
  Officer of the Most Exalted Order of the Star of Sarawak (PBS) (1989)
  Commander of the Order of the Star of Hornbill Sarawak (PGBK) – Datuk (1998)
  :
  Grand Knight of the Order of Sultan Ahmad Shah of Pahang (SSAP) – Dato' Sri (2009)

See also
 Miri (federal constituency)

References

External links
 Official blog

 
 
 

 https://www.reuters.com/finance/stocks/officer-profile/IOIB.KL/2565290

Government ministers of Malaysia
Commanders of the Order of the Star of Hornbill Sarawak
Living people
Malaysian people of Hakka descent
Malaysian politicians of Chinese descent
People from Bao'an County
20th-century Malaysian lawyers
Members of Gray's Inn
1945 births
People from Kuching
Sarawak United Peoples' Party politicians
Members of the Dewan Rakyat
Commanders of the Order of Loyalty to the Crown of Malaysia